The 1950 Nippon Professional Baseball season was the first season for baseball in Japan that used the new two league format since the split the previous year. The two leagues would be known as the Central League and the Pacific League.

Regular season

Standings

Postseason

Japan Series

League leaders

Central League

Pacific League

Awards
Most Valuable Player
Makoto Kozuru, Shochiku Robins (CL)
Kaoru Betto, Mainichi Orions (PL)
Rookie of the Year
Nobuo Oshima, Shochiku Robins (CL)
Atsushi Aramaki, Mainichi Orions (PL)
Eiji Sawamura Award
Shigeo Sanada, Shochiku Robins (CL)

See also
1950 All-American Girls Professional Baseball League season
1950 Major League Baseball season

References